Political parties in  Saint-Martin lists political parties in Saint-Martin.

The parties
Union for Progress/UMP (Union pour le Progrès, Louis Constant-Fleming)
Rally Responsibility Success (Rassemblement responsabilité réussite, Alain Richardson)
Succeed Saint Martin (Réussir Saint-Martin, Jean-Luc Hamlet)
Alliance (Alliance, Dominique Riboud)
Democratic Alliance for Saint Martin (Alliance démocratique pour Saint-Martin, Wendel Cocks)
Union for Democracy (Union pour la démocratie, Daniel Gibbs)
Saint-Martin gathering (Rassemblement Saint-Martinois, Louis Mussington)

See also

 Lists of political parties

 
Saint-Martin
Collectivity of Saint Martin-related lists
+Saint Martin
Saint Martin